Urosalpinx boggsi is an extinct species of sea snail, a marine gastropod mollusk in the family Muricidae, the murex snails or rock snails.

Description

Distribution
Fossils were found in Pleistocene strata of Ecuador.

References

External links
 

boggsi
Gastropods described in 1941
Pleistocene gastropods